

The Max Planck Institute for Marine Microbiology is located in Bremen, Germany. It was founded in 1992, almost a year after the foundation of its sister institute, the Max Planck Institute for Terrestrial Microbiology at Marburg. In 1996, the institute moved into new buildings at the campus of the University of Bremen. It is one of 80 institutes in the Max Planck Society (Max Planck Gesellschaft).

Currently, the institute consists of three departments with several associated research groups:
 Biogeochemistry (headed by Dr. Marcel Kuypers)
 Molecular Ecology (headed Prof. Dr. Rudolf Amann)
 Symbiosis (headed by Prof. Dr. Nicole Dubilier)

Additionally, the following research groups reside in the institute.
 Microbial Physiology (headed by Dr. Boran Kartal)
 Greenhouse Gases (headed Dr. Jana Milucka)
 Microbial Genomics and Bioinformatics (headed by Prof. Dr. Frank Oliver Glöckner)
 Flow Cytometry (headed by Dr. Bernhard Fuchs)
 Metabolic Interactions (headed by Dr. Manuel Liebeke)
 Microsensors (headed by Dr. Dirk de Beer)
 HGF MPG Joint Research Group for Deep-Sea Ecology and Technology (headed by Prof. Dr. Antje Boetius)
 MARUM MPG Bridge Group Marine Glycobiology (headed Dr. Jan-Hendrik Hehemann)
 Max Planck Research Group Microbial Metabolism (headed by Dr. Tristan Wagner)
 Marine Geochemistry Group (headed by Prof. Dr. Thorsten Dittmar)
 Max Planck Research Group for Marine Isotope Geochemistry (headed by Dr. Katharine Pahnke-May)

Degree programme 
 The MPI for Marine Microbiology offers the PhD programme "International Max-Planck Research School (IMPRS) of Marine Microbiology" (Marmic) together with the Alfred Wegener Institute for Polar and Marine Research, the University of Bremen and Jacobs University Bremen.

References

External links 
 Official site MPI-Bremen

Marine Microbiology
Genetics in Germany
Microbiology institutes